The 2020 TK Sparta Prague Open was a women's tennis tournament played on Clay in Prague , Czech Republic, and was part of the 2020 WTA 125K series.

This was the first edition and was held from 29 August to 6 September 2020.

Kristína Kučová won the title, defeating Elisabetta Cocciaretto in the final, 6–4, 6–3.

Seeds

Draw

Finals

Top half

Section 1

Section 2

Section 3

Section 4

Bottom half

Section 5

Section 6

Section 7

Section 8

References

External Links
Main Draw

Advantage Cars Prague Open - Singles